Independence Day is most important event in the history of Jordan, marking its independence from the British government. 

Following World War I, the Hashemite Army of the Great Arab Revolt, took over and secured present-day Jordan. The revolt was launched by the Hashemites and led by Sharif Hussein of Mecca against the Ottoman Empire. The revolt was supported by the Allies of World War I including Britain and France. 

Emir Abdullāh and the British negotiation about independence, the treaty was signed on March 22, 1946, it took two years for Jordan to be fully independent, in March 1948, Jordan signed it Britain another treaty in which all restrictions on sovereignty were removed for Jordan to be fully independent.

Jordan became a full member of the United Nations and the Arab League in December 1955. Following independence, Jordan established its parliament in 1952 consisting of two houses, the Senate and the House of Representatives.

The holiday is usually marked with official ceremonies attended by members of the House of Hashim, as well as civil and military officials. Award presentations, political speeches and diplomatic visits are commonplace on the holiday. In the Jordanian Armed Forces, Presentation of Colours ceremonies and national/unit military parades are common during the day, as well as a 21-gun salute in the capital. On the civilian level, festive events and activities including a fireworks display and special religious services are held.

See also
Public holidays in Jordan
History of Jordan
Timeline of the Hashemite Kingdom of Jordan

References 

May observances
Jordan
Summer events in Jordan